George Leonard Berry (September 12, 1882December 4, 1948) was president of the International Printing Pressmen and Assistants' Union of North America from 1907 to 1948 and a Democratic United States Senator from Tennessee from 1937 to 1938.

Early life
Berry was born in Hawkins County, Tennessee, near Rogersville.  He left home at a very early age, becoming a pressman's assistant in 1891.  He worked in this trade and was a labor union activist, being elected president of its international union in 1907.

Pressmen's Home
During his tenure, the Pressmen's Union acquired and operated the former Hale Springs Resort, a mineral water resort in East Tennessee not far from Berry's boyhood home, as a sanatorium for its members suffering from "consumption" (tuberculosis), a common ailment of its members in that era, a residential trade school for its members to learn more advanced trades and increase their income, and as its international headquarters.

Berry had learned of its availability during a visit to his home area in conjunction with a search of the relatively nearby Asheville, North Carolina area, then renowned for its supposed curative properties with regard to respiratory disease.  This facility became known as the Pressmen's Home. It was designed to be largely self-sufficient, and one point had a large agricultural operation, and, prior to the coming of the Tennessee Valley Authority, its own hydroelectric power plant.

Political experience
In World War I, Berry participated in the American Expeditionary Force with the rank of major, serving overseas 1918–1919, and then returned home to resume active leadership of his union.  He was frequently a delegate to many national and international labor meetings and congresses, and at the 1924 Democratic Convention, was almost nominated for Vice President.  On May 6, 1937, he was appointed to the United States Senate by governor of Tennessee Gordon Browning to serve in the place of Nathan L. Bachman, who had died in office.

Turning the day-to-day operation of the union over to others, Berry moved to Washington, D.C. to attend to his senatorial duties.  Berry apparently enjoyed being a Senator well enough to desire election in his own right, and ran a campaign seeking the nomination to the balance of the term in the August, 1938 Democratic primary.

However, the people of Tennessee were apparently more interested having the sort of Senator more traditionally associated with the Democratic Party's Southern conservative wing than a labor activist, and Berry was defeated for the nomination by attorney Tom Stewart.  Governor Browning, who had appointed him to the Senate, was defeated for renomination by Prentice Cooper in the same primary.

Some political historians feel that these defeats can be almost entirely attributed to the influence of the Memphis-based political machine of E. H. Crump, who supported both Stewart and Cooper.  Berry's service as a Senator ended on November 8, 1938, when the votes in the general election indicating Stewart's election were tallied, even though Stewart did not actually take the seat until early the next year.

Death
Berry returned to day-to-day operation of the union and his interests, including agriculture, around the Pressmen's Home until his death.  (The union continued to operate the facility for several years after Berry's death.)  He was interred at Pressmen's Home but his body was later moved to McKinney Cemetery in nearby Rogersville.

See also
Pressmen's Home
Rogersville, Tennessee
United States Senate

External links
 

1882 births
1948 deaths
People from Rogersville, Tennessee
Tennessee Democrats
Democratic Party United States senators from Tennessee
Candidates in the 1924 United States presidential election
20th-century American politicians